Fuck Yo Feelings is a mixtape by American musician Robert Glasper. It was released on October 3, 2019 through Loma Vista Recordings, his first one with that music label. Recording sessions took place at Henson Recording Studios in Los Angeles, at Sound Inn Studio in Tokyo, and at More Than Enough Studios. Production was handled by Glasper himself, with co-producers Chris Dave, Derrick Hodge and Curtis Jews. It features guest appearances from Affion Crockett, Andra Day, Baby Rose, Bilal, Bridget Kelly, Buddy, Denzel Curry, Herbie Hancock, James Poyser, Mick Jenkins, Mos Def, Muhsinah, Queen Sheba, Rapsody, SiR, Song Bird, Staceyann Chin, Terrace Martin, YBN Cordae and Yebba.

The album was nominated for the Grammy Award for Best Progressive R&B Album at the 63rd Annual Grammy Awards, but lost to Thundercat's It Is What It Is.

Track listing

Charts

References

External links 

2019 mixtape albums
Robert Glasper albums
Loma Vista Recordings albums